The Energy Efficiency Directive 2012/27/EU (abbreviated EED) is a European Union directive which mandates energy efficiency improvements within the European Union. It was approved on 25 October 2012 and entered into force on 4 December 2012.  The directive introduces legally binding measures to encourage efforts to use energy more efficiently in all stages and sectors of the supply chain.  It establishes a common framework for the promotion of energy efficiency within the EU in order to meet its energy efficiency headline target of 20% by 2020.  It also paves the way for further improvements thereafter.

The directive provides for the establishment of indicative national energy efficiency targets for 2020.  Member states were to have submitted their National Energy Efficiency Action Plans (NEEAP) by 30 April 2014, outlining the measures they have implemented to improve energy efficiency and their expected and/or achieved energy savings.  In addition, member states are required to report annually on progress toward their national targets.  The policy requirements in the directive are minimum obligations and member states may introduce more stringent measures.

The Energy Efficiency Directive 2012/27/EU was preceded by the Energy Services Directive 2006/32/EC. This earlier directive contained a target of a 9% reduction in energy usage within 9years of the directive coming into force.  The earlier directive also required EU members to submit National Energy Efficiency Action Plans, with the first plan to be lodged by 30 June 2007.

On 23 July 2014, the European Commission announced a new target of a 30% improvement in energy efficiency by 2030.

Development 
Documents leaked in  show that the United Kingdom repeatedly fought to water down key measures during the development of the directive and forced some measures to become voluntary rather than mandatory. As a result, a new version of the directive allows member states to set their own energy efficiency targets, instead of the original requirement of a mandatory  target of 20% improvement.

Measures 
The directive promotes rules to remove barriers in energy markets and to overcome market failures that may impede the uptake of energy efficiency. Under the directive, the public sector is to play an exemplary role and consumers will have a right to know how much energy they consume.

The following categories are covered by the directive:

 energy efficiency targets
 building renovation
 an exemplary role for public buildings
 energy efficiency obligation schemes
 energy audits and energy management systems
 metering and billing information systems and the right to access this data
 consumer information and empowerment
 promotion of efficiency in heating and cooling
 energy transformation, transmission, and distribution
 availability of qualification, accreditation, and certification schemes
 information and training
 energy services
 an energy efficiency national fund, financing, and technical support
 other measures to promote energy efficiency

National Energy Efficiency Action Plans and Annual Reports 

Individual National Energy Efficiency Action Plans (NEEAP) for 2014 and Annual Reports for 2016 are available for download. Some national action plans have Wikipedia articles as well:

 German National Action Plan on Energy Efficiency

Reception and effectiveness 
A 2014 study finds that, despite the directive being technically complex and lacking binding targets, it is an improvement over earlier European Union policy on energy efficiency. Notwithstanding, the document is weakened by the number of exemptions and the number of passages it contains requiring interpretation. The process of implementation was also subject to problems.

In June 2014 the UK government directed through a Procurement Policy Note issued to all government departments that they were to comply after 5 June 2014 with the energy efficiency standards of Article 6 and Annex III to the Directive when purchasing goods and services and when renting or purchasing buildings, as long as this is "consistent with achieving value for money, economic
feasibility, wider sustainability, technical suitability and ensuring sufficient competition". Further information issued in January 2015 made clear that "the obligation under Article 6 is a qualified one" and that public bodies "need only buy to the standards set out in Annex III of the Directive where this is cost effective". Public bodies in the wider public sector outside of central government were "encouraged" to follow the central government example.

A 2016 study examined the treatment of article7 of the directive by each of the 28 member states. Titled Energy efficiency obligation schemes, this key article requires that countries "implement energy efficiency obligations and/or alternative policy instruments in order to reach a reduction in final energy use of 1.5% per year". To fulfill this requirement, the member states have proposed very different policy measures and adopted very different calculation methods and monitoring and verification schemes. The study analyses each national action plan and estimates whether the projected savings are likely to materialise and whether these will be sufficient to meet the article7 target.

Future developments 
Directive 2018/2002/EC was adopted on 21 December 2018. It amends this one.

External links 
 European Commission National Energy Efficiency Action Plans

See also 

 Energy conservation
 Energy efficiency in Europe (study) – a study as part of the Odyssee Mure project
 
 Energy policy of the European Union
 Energy Taxation Directive
 EU Renewable Energy Directive 2009/28/EC – a similar directive covering renewable energy
 European Union directive
 German National Action Plan on Energy Efficiency (abbreviated NAPE)
 List of European Union directives
 White certificates – which certify a reduction in energy consumption

Further reading

References

External links 

 Complete list of National Energy Efficiency Plans and Annual Reports.
 European Commission Energy Efficiency Directive website
 Odyssee Mure energy efficiency monitoring project for Europe

Energy efficiency policy
Energy in Europe
2012 in law
Energy conservation in Europe
Energy in the European Union
Energy policy in Europe
European Union energy law
European Union directives